The Dikika is an area of the Afar Region of Ethiopia where the hominin fossil named Selam was found (a specimen of the Australopithecus afarensis species). Dikika is located in Mille woreda.

Dikika is also given to name a basal member of the Hadar formation, a series of sedimentary rocks deposited approximately 3.4 million years ago, which have been exposed by the erosive action of the Awash River. Although sometimes called "Lucy's Child" Dikika was in fact older than Lucy or Dinknesh at 3.4 million years.

Notes

Further reading 
 J.E. Kalb, E.B. Oswald, A. Mebrate, S. Tebedge and C. Jolly, Stratigraphy of the Awash Group, Middle Awash Valley, Afar, Ethiopia, Newsletters on Stratigraphy 11 (1982), pp. 95–127.

Afar Region
Archaeological sites in Ethiopia
Piacenzian
Archaeological sites of Eastern Africa